The 1979 Ipswich Borough Council election was the first election to the Ipswich Borough Council under the new arrangements determined by the Local Government Boundary Commission as laid out in their Report 280. In accordance with the Local Government Act 1972 the Council had request a system of electing by thirds. Originally the Council had argued for 18 wards with 3 councillors each, making 54 in total. However, when this was analysed in terms of the Suffolk County Council (SCC), this was more numerous than would be compatible with the SCC's desired size of 75 members. The Ipswich Borough Council was invited to submit a revised proposal, leading to the creation of 16 wards with 3 councillors each. This became the finalised structure of the wards for the 1979 election.

It took place as part of the 1979 United Kingdom local elections.  

There were 16 wards returning between 3 councillors each. The Labour Party gained control of the Council. It took place as part of the 1979 United Kingdom local elections.

Wards

Bixley

References

Ipswich Borough Council elections
Ipswich